Bin Down is a hill,  high near Liskeard in the county of Cornwall, England. Its prominence of 101 metres qualifies it as a HuMP.

Bin Down is located near the south Cornish coast, about 6 kilometres NNE of Looe. Its summit lies within the grounds of Looe Golf Course, near the 7th tee. There is a trig point near the summit.

References 

Hills of Cornwall
Cornish Killas